Lysipomia is a genus of flowering plants in the family Campanulaceae. They are cushion-like mountain plants all endemic to the high Andes. The genus is monophyletic.

There are about 40 described species. There are about 10 more recognized taxa not yet described to science.

Described species include:

Lysipomia acaulis Kunth
Lysipomia aretioides Kunth
Lysipomia bilineata McVaugh
Lysipomia bourgonii Ernst
Lysipomia brachysiphonia (Zahlbr.) E.Wimm.
Lysipomia caespitosa T.J.Ayers
Lysipomia crassomarginata (E.Wimm.) Jeppesen
Lysipomia cuspidata McVaugh
Lysipomia cylindrocarpa T.J.Ayers
Lysipomia glandulifera (Wedd.) Schltr & E.Wimm.
Lysipomia globularis E.Wimm.
Lysipomia gracilis (E.Wimm) E.Wimm
Lysipomia hirta E.Wimm.
Lysipomia hutchinsonii McVaugh
Lysipomia laciniata A.DC.
Lysipomia laricina E.Wimm.
Lysipomia lehmannii Hieron. ex Zahlbr.
Lysipomia mitsyae Syvester & D.Quandt
Lysipomia montioides Kunth
Lysipomia multiflora McVaugh
Lysipomia muscoides Hook.f.
Lysipomia oblinqua E.Wimm., 1048
Lysipomia oellgaardii Jeppesen
Lysipomia petrosa T.J.Ayers
Lysipomia pumila (Wedd.)E.Wimm.
Lysipomia repens F.Phil.
Lysipomia rhizomata McVaugh
Lysipomia sparrei Jeppesen
Lysipomia speciosa T.J.Ayers
Lysipomia sphagnophila Griseb. ex Wedd.
Lysipomia subpetata McVaugh
Lysipomia tubulosa McVaugh
Lysipomia vitreola McVaugh
Lysipomia wurdackii McVaugh

References

 
Campanulaceae genera
Flora of the Andes
Taxonomy articles created by Polbot